On 27 January 1969, Iraqi authorities hanged 14 alleged spies (nine Jews, three Muslims and two Christians) for Israel in a public execution in Baghdad.

Background
By 1969, Iraq's Jewish community had shrunk from more than 130,000 in 1948 to less than 3,000 due to mass emigration caused by the establishment of the State of Israel, the subsequent Arab-Israeli wars, and anti-Jewish persecution.

The lopsided defeat suffered by the Arab states, including Iraq, against Israel in the June 1967 Six-Day War further increased discrimination against Iraq's remaining Jews: "They were dismissed from government jobs, their bank accounts were frozen and they were confined to house arrest, among other restrictions."

In July 1968, the Arab Socialist Ba'ath Party took control of Iraq in a bloodless coup.  The new government was weak and was in constant fear that it would itself be the target of a coup. After the Israeli Air Force struck an Iraqi military position in northern Jordan on 4 December 1968 in retaliation for the shelling of Israeli communities in the Galilee, the Ba'athist regime began "hunting down an American-Israeli spy ring it said was trying to destabilize Iraq." The authorities began arresting alleged conspirators shortly thereafter, including twelve Jewish men from Baghdad and Basra.

The hangings
Baghdad Radio invited citizens to Liberation Square on January 27 to "come and enjoy the feast", being brought in on buses. 500,000 people reportedly attended the hangings, and danced and celebrated before the corpses of the convicted spies. Nine of the fourteen hanged were Jews; the remaining three Jews of the initial twelve arrested were executed on 26 August 1969.

The Jewish victims
The nine Jewish victims were:

Aftermath

The executions led to significant international criticism, with United States Secretary of State William P. Rogers condemning Iraq's actions as "repugnant to the conscience of the world" and Egypt's Al-Ahram cautioning: "The hanging of fourteen people in the public square is certainly not a heart-warming sight, nor is it the occasion for organizing a spectacle." By contrast, the Soviet Union's official radio called the executions "fully justified," while Charles de Gaulle of France said they could not be divorced from the broader Arab–Israeli conflict. Baghdad Radio rebutted Iraq's critics: "We hanged spies, but the Jews crucified Christ." According to author Kanan Makiya, the negative publicity "has less to do with the activities of a Zionist lobby as the Ba'ath claimed, as much as it was the outcome of the deliberately public nature of the proceedings. Later the Ba'ath learnt the art of sealing out the outside world." The persecution of Iraq's Jews continued after the spy trials: "By the time of the August executions, 51 Jews had been killed by the regime in 1969 alone; 100 more were imprisoned or tortured." In the early 1970s, nearly all of Iraq's Jewish population left after being permitted to leave. Only a small number stayed behind, largely those who were too old to travel.

Makiya credits the hangings with helping the Ba'athist government consolidate control of Iraq, stating: "The terror that, from a Ba'athist viewpoint, was premature and badly handled in 1963, worked and was skillfully deployed the second time around."

See also
List of massacres in Iraq

References

Jewish Iraqi history
1969 in Iraq
Public executions
Antisemitism in Iraq
Jews and Judaism in Baghdad
Iraq–Israel relations
People executed by Iraq by hanging
20th-century executions by Iraq
People convicted of spying for Israel